Kotri is a city and the headquarters of the Kotri Taluka of Jamshoro District of Sindh province in Pakistan. Located on the right bank of the Indus River, it is the 29th largest city in Pakistan by population.

Name
The name Koṭri is the diminutive form of the word koṭ, meaning "fort"; thus, the name means "little fort".

Demographics
According to the 1998 Pakistan Census, the population of Kotri city was recorded as 62,085. As per 2017 Census of Pakistan, the population of city was recorded as 259,358 with an immense increase of 317.75% in just 19 years.

Economy
Kotri is a hub for textile production and fishing.

Education

Universities
Mehran University of Engineering and Technology
University of Sindh  Jamshoro
 Liaquat University of Medical & Health Sciences

Notable people
Ali Muhammad (1940 – 8 August 2016), known professionally as Ali Baba (Sindhi: علي بابا, Urdu: علی بابا), was a notable Sindhi-language drama writer and novelist. He was born in Kotri. He died on 8 August 2016 due to heart attack in his home Karachi.

References

Populated places in Jamshoro District
Talukas of Sindh